
Koop or KOOP may refer to:

People
Koop (surname), multiple people

Culture and entertainment
Koop (band), a Swedish jazz duo consisting of Magnus Zingmark and Oscar Simonsson
KOOP (FM), a radio station (91.7 FM) in Austin, Texas, United States
"Never Koop a Koopa", a Super Mario Bros. television series episode

Companies
Koop Dairy, a dairy products company in Cyprus

See also
 Coop (disambiguation)